Paper jam may refer to:

 Mario & Luigi: Paper Jam, A 2015 video game
 Paper Jamz, a defunct toyline